Didier Cohen is an American-born Model, DJ/Producer.

Career

Cohen was discovered by an agent from Wilhelmina Models walking down Sunset Boulevard in Los Angeles. He then moved to Australia and did a model campaign with Miranda Kerr. He has been featured in campaigns for Dolce & Gabbana, Nike and Adidas, and was the face of Industrie with Miranda Kerr for two years. 
Didier took part in being a judge on Australia's Next Top Model, as well as other TV shows.

Cohen now resides in Los Angeles California where he is a DJ and Producer. He co-produced 'Elevate' on the Spider-Man-into the Spideverse movie soundtrack.

Personal life 
Didier Cohen battles with Lyme Disease. 
He was engaged to Chadwick Model Jade Cara.

Film and television 
Cohen has appeared in three short films (Nightcrawlers, Coincidence and Mind Games), directed by James Demitri

Cohen competed in and was later eliminated from The Celebrity Apprentice Australia, where he was raising money for his charity, Youth Off The Streets.

His most recent TV appearance was as a mentor for the ninth season of Australia's Next Top Model.

References 
 

Living people
Australian Jews
Australian male models
American emigrants to Australia
Jewish Australian male actors
The Apprentice Australia candidates
1988 births